Wrecker, The Wrecker or Wrecking may refer to:

 Tow truck, the most common form of recovery vehicle
 Wrecking, a synonym for demolition
 A person who participates in sabotage
 Wrecking (Soviet Union), a crime of industrial or economic sabotage
 Wrecking (shipwreck), hauling away valuables from a shipwreck

Film and television
 Wrecker (film), a 2015 film
 The Wrecker (1929 film), based on Ridley's play
 The Wrecker (1933 film)
 "Wrecker", a clone trooper in the Star Wars series
 Wreckers (film), a 2011 film
 Wreckers (Transformers), a sub-team of Autobots in the fictional Transformers Universe 
 Thee Wreckers, characters in Thee Wreckers Tetralogy by artist filmmaker Rosto

Literature
 Wrecker (comics), a Marvel Comics supervillain
 The Wrecker (Cussler novel), a 2009 novel by Clive Cussler and Justin Scott
 The Wrecker (Stevenson novel), an 1892 novel by Robert Louis Stevenson and Lloyd Osbourne
 The Wrecker (play), a 1924 play by Arnold Ridley

Music
 Wrecker, an album by the Mono Men
 "Wrecker", a song by Megadeth from Th1rt3en
 The Wreckers, a musical country duo
 The Wreckers (opera), a 1906 opera by Ethel Smyth
 "The Wreckers", a song by Rush from the 2012 album Clockwork Angels
 "Thee Wreckers", a music project by artist/musician Rosto

People
 The Wrecker, nickname for American professional bodybuilder Sarah Dunlap

See also
 The Wreckers (disambiguation)
 Wrecked (disambiguation)